In Romanian historiography, the Great Union or Great Union of 1918 was the series of political unifications the Kingdom of Romania had with several of the so-called Romanian historical regions, starting with Bessarabia on 27 March 1918, continuing with Bukovina on 28 November 1918 and finalizing with Transylvania (on its broad meaning) on 1 December 1918 with the declaration of the union of this region with Romania during an assembly at the city of Alba Iulia. Romanians also consider several other events as preludes to the Great Union, such as the unification of Moldavia and Wallachia (also known as the Little Union) in 1859 or the independence of the country and the annexation of Northern Dobruja in 1878, and also the occupation of Transylvania and Moldavia by the Prince of Wallachia, Michael the Brave, in 1600.

Today, the Great Union has an important meaning in Romania, and it is commemorated in the Great Union Day, the national day of the country, every 1 December. The centenary of the Great Union on 1 December 2018 was widely celebrated in Romania, with military parades at cities like Alba Iulia or Bucharest to which many people (up to 550,000, 100,000 of them in Alba Iulia alone), including the President of Romania Klaus Iohannis, attended. It was also celebrated in Moldova, where more than 100 localities and 3 districts declared unification with Romania.

See also
 Dacianism
 Greater Romania
 Protochronism
 Romanian nationalism

References

External links
 
 

 
Greater Romania
1918 in Romania
December 1918 events in Europe
Politics of Romania
History of Romania
Kingdom of Romania
Romania in World War I
Romanian nationalism
Romanian irredentism
National unifications
Territorial evolution of Romania
History of Banat
History of Bessarabia
History of Bukovina
History of Crișana
History of Dobruja
History of Maramureș
History of Transylvania
History of Eastern Europe